Heterodera ciceri is a plant pathogenic nematode infecting lentils and chickpeas.

See also 
 List of lentil diseases
 List of chickpea diseases

References

External links 
 Nemaplex, University of California - Heterodera ciceri

ciceri
Pulse crop diseases
Agricultural pest nematodes